Urnaloricus is a genus of loricifera; it is distinct enough to belong to its own family, Urnaloricidae.  Loricifera are phylum that are animals that live in marine area only, and very small in size. The Urnaloricus was found Southwest in the Faroe Islands, North Atlantic. It was the thirty-eighth loriciferan species found. One part of the life cycle is the Higgins larva and it is introverted with eight two-segmented clavoscalids.

The genus includes:

References 

Loricifera